Acrogaster is a genus of fossil fish of the order Beryciformes, found in the Cretaceous period.

Species
There is currently 1 recognized species in this genus:
 Acrogaster parvus Agassiz, 1839

References

Beryciformes